La hipocondríaca (English: The Hypochondriac) is a 2013 Colombian telenovela produced and broadcast by Caracol Television.

Cast 
 Stephanie Cayo - Macarena González
 Ernesto Calzadilla - Alejandro Pulido
 Cristina Campuzano - Camila Santos
 John Alex Toro - Juan Jhon "JJ"
 Maria Cecilia Botero - Maruja Maldonado de Pulido
 Kepa Amuchastegui - Alfonso Pulido
 Nicolás Montero - Pedro Pulido
 Alberto León Jaramillo - Francisco Gonzalez "Tio Pacho"
 Marcela Benjumea - Esther
 Julio César Herrera - Mario Herrera
 Margarita Amado - Matilde
 Ernesto Ballen - Jimmy
 Bebsabe Duque - Gina González
 Marilyn Patiño - Luz Elvira
 Leonardo Acosta - Leonardo
 Laura Torres - Juliana Pulido
 Ignacio Hijuelos - Carlos Bejarano
 Héctor Ulloa - Avellaneda
 Marcela Agudelo - Marcela Bufano
 Nicole Santamaría - Cecilia Bustos
 Ilja Rosendahl - Diego
 Juan Sebastian Caicedo - Javier
 Alma Rodriguez - Rosaura González
 Rita Bendeck - Sandra Romero
 Lina Tejeiro - Tatiana
 Stefanía Gómez - Linda Rosa
 Consuelo Moure - Adela
 Victor Cifuentes - Dr. Consuegra
 Walther Luengas - Albeiro Manrique
 Julián Díaz - "Tumaco"
 Andrés Salazar - Lolo
 Gerly Hassam Gómez - Patricio
 Nayra Castillo - Luisa
 César Alvarez - Bocadillo
 German "Tuto" Patiño - Dr. Ignacio
 Astrid Junguito - Herminia
 Michelle Manterola

Awards and nominations

Promax Latinoamérica 2013

Premios Clic Caracol

References

External links 
  

2013 telenovelas
Colombian telenovelas
2013 Colombian television series debuts
2013 Colombian television series endings
Caracol Televisión telenovelas
Spanish-language telenovelas
Television shows set in Bogotá
Television shows set in Cartagena, Colombia
Sony Pictures Television telenovelas